Julienne Keutcha (21 October 1924 – 2000) was a Cameroonian politician. In 1960 she was the first woman elected to the National Assembly of French Cameroon.

Biography
Keutcha was born in 1924 in the village of Ngwatta near Santchou. She graduated from a beauty institute in Paris, and became a childcare worker. She married Jean Keutcha, who later became a minister and ambassador.

She was a candidate in the 1960 parliamentary elections and became the first woman elected to the National Assembly. She remained in office until 1972. During her time in parliament she was secretary of the Bureau and sat on the Foreign Affairs Committee. She also became a member of the bureau of the Cameroon National Union and was the only woman member of the committee at the time.

She died in 2000.

References

1924 births
20th-century Cameroonian women politicians
20th-century Cameroonian politicians
Members of the National Assembly (Cameroon)
Cameroon People's Democratic Movement politicians
2000 deaths
Cameroonian expatriates in France